Wouter de Vogel (born 17 September 1990 in Gouda) is a Dutch footballer who most recently played as a winger for FC Lienden. He formerly played for AZ, Telstar, ADO Den Haag, FC Dordrecht and FC Den Bosch.

References

External links
 Voetbal International profile 

1990 births
Living people
Dutch footballers
ADO Den Haag players
SC Telstar players
FC Dordrecht players
FC Den Bosch players
TOP Oss players
Eredivisie players
Eerste Divisie players
Footballers from Gouda, South Holland
Association football wingers